TBM may refer to:
 Technology business management, a methodology for managing IT departments
 Socata TBM, a family of single engine turboprop aircraft
 Tactical ballistic missile
 Tambaram railway station, Chennai, Tamil Nadu, India (Southern Railway station code)
 Theatre ballistic missile
 Grumman TBM Avenger, a torpedo bomber
 Tracheobronchomalacia, a condition affecting the trachea
 Transferable belief model, a mathematical theory on uncertainty
 Tunnel boring machine, used to excavate tunnels with a circular cross section
 Transports Bordeaux Métropole, a French public transport system
 Trailing bit manipulation, a type of bit manipulation instruction set
 Tuberculomucin Weleminsky, a treatment for tuberculosis
 tert-Butylthiol, also known as tert-butyl mercaptan

Music and entertainment:
 The Birthday Massacre, a Canadian synth-rock band
 The Beautiful Music, a Canadian indie record label
 Three Blind Mice, a Japanese record label
 Techno Body Music, genre similar to Electronic body music but inspired by techno and trance